Torbjørn Falkanger (8 October 1927 in Trondheim – 16 July 2013) was a Norwegian ski jumper who was active in the late 1940s and early 1950s.
 
Falkanger earned a silver medal at the 1952 Winter Olympics in ski jumping and also won the Holmenkollen ski festival ski jumping competition twice (1949 and 1950). For his ski jumping efforts, Falkanger was awarded the Holmenkollen medal in 1952 (Shared with Stein Eriksen, Heikki Hasu and Nils Karlsson.)

Falkanger also took the Olympic Oath at the 1952 games in Oslo.

His career ended a few months ahead of the 1956 Winter Olympics, due to a fall in the ski jumping hill.

References

IOC 1952 Winter Olympics
Holmenkollen medalists - click Holmenkollmedaljen for downloadable pdf file 
Holmenkollen winners since 1892 - click Vinnere for downloadable pdf file 

1927 births
2013 deaths
Holmenkollen medalists
Holmenkollen Ski Festival winners
Norwegian male ski jumpers
Olympic ski jumpers of Norway
Olympic silver medalists for Norway
Ski jumpers at the 1952 Winter Olympics
Olympic medalists in ski jumping
Medalists at the 1952 Winter Olympics
Oath takers at the Olympic Games
Sportspeople from Trondheim
20th-century Norwegian people